Cadillac is a General Motors luxury car brand.

Cadillac may also refer to:

People
Antoine de la Mothe Cadillac, French explorer, founder of Detroit
Marie-Therese Guyon Cadillac, American pioneer
Cadillac Anderson (born 1964) nickname of U.S. basketball player Gregory Wayne Anderson
Cadillac Williams (born 1982) nickname of U.S. American football player Carnell Lamar Williams

Geography
Cadillac (Montreal Metro), a metro station on the green line in Montreal
Cadillac, Gironde, a commune in the Gironde department, in southwestern France
Cadillac, Michigan, United States
Cadillac, Saskatchewan, Canada
Cadillac, a former municipality now part of Rouyn-Noranda, Quebec, Canada
Cadillac Mountain, Maine, United States
Cadillac Ranch (disambiguation)
Lake Cadillac, a lake in Cadillac, Michigan

Arts, entertainment, and media

Games
Cadillac, a variation on the card game Thirty-one played in south Louisiana
Square Deal: The Game of Two Dimensional Poker, known in Japan as Cadillac II, a Hect video game
Cadillacs and Dinosaurs (video game), a 1993 beat 'em up video game

Music
Cadillac (album), a 1989 album by Johnny Hallyday
Cadillac (band), a Spanish pop band
Cadillac (record label), a jazz record label founded in the United Kingdom in 1973
The Cadillacs, a vocal group from the United States

Songs
"Brand New Cadillac", a 1959 song also recorded as "Cadillac"
"Cadilac" (sic), the B-side of the T. Rex 1972 single Telegram Sam
"Cadillac", a 1960 song from Bo Diddley's album Bo Diddley Is a Gunslinger
"Cadillac", a 1964 song by the British rock band The Renegades
"Cadillac", a 1986 song from The Firm's album Mean Business
"Cadillac", a 1989 song from Johnny Hallyday's eponymous album Cadillac
"Cadillac", a 2011 song from the Original 7ven album Condensate
"Cadillac" (Morgenshtern and Eldzhey song), a 2020 song by Russian rappers Morgenshtern and Eldzhey

Other arts, entertainment, and media
Cadillac, a guitar model made by Dean Guitars
"The Cadillac", an episode of the television series Seinfeld
Cadillacs and Dinosaurs, a TV animated series

Brands and enterprises
Cadillac Gage, now part of Textron Marine & Land Systems
 Cadillac insurance plan in the United States

Wine and grapes
Burger (grape), a California-French wine grape that is also known as Cadillac
Cadillac AOC, the appellation d'origine contrôlée Bordeaux wine produced in the French commune
Muscadelle, a French wine grape that is also known as Cadillac
Trebbiano, an Italian wine grape that is also known as Cadillac

Other uses
Cadillac, an alternative name for cocaine

See also

List of Cadillac vehicles, automobiles from GM division Cadillac
Cadillac-en-Fronsadais, a commune in the Gironde department, in southwestern France
Cadillac, Cadillac (2014 song) rock song by Train